Reigate School is an 11–16 mixed secondary school with academy status in Reigate, Surrey, England. It has been a part of the Greensand Multi-Academy Trust since 1 November 2017.

References

External links 
 

Reigate
Academies in Surrey
Secondary schools in Surrey